is a city located in Saga Prefecture on the island of Kyushu, Japan. In 2011, the city government was the first in Japan to switch to using Facebook for its website. As of October 1, 2016, the city has an estimated population of 48,845 and a population density of 257 persons per km². The total area is 195.44 km².

On March 1, 2006, the towns of Kitagata and Yamauchi (both from Kishima District) were merged into Takeo.

Geography
Takeo is located in the western part of Saga Prefecture. Takeo has a complex topography including mountains, mountain basins and riverside plains.
Mountains:　Mt. Mifune (210 m), Mt. Hachiman (764 m), Mt. Bi (518 m), Mt. Jinroku (447 m) 
Rivers: Rokkaku River, Shiomi River, Yamanaka River

Adjoining municipalities
Saga Prefecture
Arita
Imari
Karatsu
Ōmachi
Shiroishi
Taku
Ureshino
Nagasaki Prefecture
Hasami

History
1889-04-01 - The modern municipal system was established. The current city region is occupied by 1 town (Takeo) and 11 villages (Asahi, Hashishita, Higashikawanobori, Kitagata, Kitsu, Nakato, Nishikawanobori, Sumiyoshi, Takeo, Takeuchi and Wakaki).
1900-06-07 - Takeo Village was incorporated into Takeo Town.
1944-04-29 - Kitamura Village became Kitamura Town.
1954-04-01 - Takeo Town absorbed the villages of Asahi, Hashishita, Higashikawanobori, Nishikawanobori, Takeuchi and Wakagi to create Takeo City. The villages of Sumiyoshi and Nakato were merged to create Yamauchi Village.
1956-04-01 - Hashishita Village was split and was incorporated into Kitagata and Shiroishi (respectively).
1960-09-01 - Yamauchi Village became Yamauchi Town.
2006-03-01 - The towns of Kitagata and Yamauchi were incorporated into Takeo City.

Education

High schools
Saga Prefectural Takeo High School

Junior high schools
Takeo Junior High School
Takeo Kita Junior High School
Kawanobori Junior High School
Kitagata Junior High School
Yamauchi Junior High School
Seiryo Junior High School

Elementary schools
Takeo Elementary School
Mifunegaoka Elementary School
Asahi Elementary School
Tachibana Elementary School
Wakaki Elementary School
Takeuchi Elementary School
Higashikawanobori Elementary School
Nishikawanobori Elementary School
Kitagata Elementary School
Yamauchi Higashi Elementary School
Yamauchi Nishi Elementary School

Transportation

Air
The nearest airports are Saga Airport followed by Nagasaki Airport.

Rail
JR Kyushu
Shinkansen
The Nishi Kyushu Shinkansen (Nagasaki Station to Takeo-Onsen Station) will open on September 23, 2022.
Sasebo Line
Kitagata Station - Takahashi Station - Takeo-Onsen Station - Nagao Station - Mimasaka Station
The main station is Takeo-Onsen.

Road
Expressways:
Nagasaki Expressway
Takeo-Kitagata Interchange - Kawanobori Service Area - Takeo Junction
Nishi-Kyūshū Expressway
Takeo Junction - Takeo Minami Interchange
National highways:
Route 34
Route 35
Route 498
Main prefectural roads:
Saga Prefectural Route 1 (Sasebo-Ureshino)
Saga Prefectural Route 25 (Taku-Wakagi)
Saga Prefectural Route 26 (Imari-Yamauchi)
Saga Prefectural Route 36 (Takeo-Fukudomi)
Saga Prefectural Route 38 (Ōchi-Yamauchi)
Saga Prefectural Route 45 (Ureshino-Yamauchi)
Saga Prefectural Route 53 (Takeo-Imari)

Notable places and festivals
Takeo Onsen
Takeo Jinja
Takeo Keirin Track
Saga Prefectural Space and Science Museum
Mifunegaoka Plum Grove
Kitagata Shiki no Oka Park
Daishō-ji
Chūō Park
Mt. Kurokami, Fūfu Rock
Kurokami no Roman festival
Mifuneyama Garden
Keishūen Garden, Yōkō Museum

Notable people
Keisuke Hiwatashi, former mayor
Yoshiko Yamaguchi, 1930s-late 1940s Singer and Actress in China

Sister cities
 Sebastopol, California

References

External links

City Government